Hidden Palms is an American teen drama television series that ran on The CW in the United States from May 30 until July 4, 2007. It was canceled after eight first-run episodes. The series, created by Kevin Williamson, portrays the fictional lives of a group of teenagers and their families residing in Palm Springs, California.

Production

Origin
The series, produced by Lionsgate Television, began production in late 2006 with the tentative title Palm Springs. The pilot episode was subsequently leaked onto the Internet before the series premiered.

In early 2007, Hidden Palms was announced to begin on March 6, 2007, at 9:00 pm Eastern/8:00 pm Central on The CW, but this timeslot later became occupied by Pussycat Dolls Present: The Search for the Next Doll. The series eventually premiered on The CW on May 30, 2007 at 8:00 pm Eastern/7:00 pm Central. It was announced on June 12, 2007, that Hidden Palms would wrap up two weeks earlier on the CW, which would stop rebroadcasting it on Sundays.

Filming
Because of the high labor costs of filming in Palm Springs, California, Hidden Palms was actually filmed at a studio in Avondale, Arizona. In the promos, mountains are shown in many (if not most) clips. However, parts of the pilot episode were filmed in Palm Springs, including downtown Palm Springs.

Broadcast
Hidden Palms premiered on The CW in the United States on May 30, 2007, at 8:00 pm Eastern/7:00 pm Central. Hidden Palms also simultaneously premiered in Canada on City, whilst premiering later in other countries around the world, including Bulgaria on Fox Life on July 21, 2007, Thursday at 10:00 pm EET, Brazil and Latin America on the A&E Network, Hungary on Viasat3, Serbia on Fox televizija, Spain on Cuatro TV, Portugal on RTP1, Sweden on TV3, Italy on Raidue, Denmark on TV3, Norway on TV3, on Fox Life in Poland, on Prime in New Zealand and on Sky One the United Kingdom in September 2007, Go in South Africa. The Nine Network in Australia has acquired the rights to broadcast it.

In the Netherlands, the entire series was released on DVD by RCV Entertainment in the summer of 2009.

Cast and characters

Main
 Michael Cassidy as Cliff Wiatt
 Taylor Handley as Johnny Miller
 Amber Heard as Greta Matthews
 Sharon Lawrence as Tess Wiatt
 D. W. Moffett as Bob Hardy
 Gail O'Grady as Karen Hardy
 Ellary Porterfield as Liza Witter
 Tessa Thompson as Nikki Barnes

Recurring
 Leslie Jordan as Jesse Jo
 J. D. Pardo as Edward "Eddie" Nolan
 J.R. Cacia as Travis Dean
 Valerie Cruz as Maria Nolan
 Kyle Secor as Alan 'Skip' Matthews

Episodes

Hidden Palms was first slated to be a mid-season show and 13 episodes had been ordered. During production, the show's episode number was lowered to 8.

Ratings

Critical reception
As of June 2007, the series received mixed reviews. It had a composite score of 45% based on 22 reviews at Metacritic.

Linda Stasi of the New York Post called it "the best rich kid show to appear on TV since that other California show died." Diane Werts of Newsday said the show "is enough to make me forgive The CW's entire sorry first season".

Conversely, Mike Duffy of the Detroit Free Press said the show is "luridly derivative" and that "there's nothing remotely hip" about it. Charlie McCollum of the San Jose Mercury News said the show "spends far too much time exploring the whiny angst of the teens". Tom Shales of The Washington Post said of the show, "you're likely to find more fascinating figures and intriguing dramatis personae in the latest catalogue from J. Peterman."

Controversy
The show came under fire from the Parents Television Council, which called the pilot "cliché-ridden" and claimed the overall plot was inappropriate for its teenage target audience due to depictions of underage drinking, parental suicide and sex. The pilot and finale were named the most offensive television programming of the weeks of their respective broadcasts.

References

External links
 
 

2007 American television series debuts
2007 American television series endings
2000s American mystery television series
2000s American teen drama television series
American television soap operas
The CW original programming
English-language television shows
Television series about families
Television series about teenagers
Television series by Lionsgate Television
Television shows set in Palm Springs, California
Television series created by Kevin Williamson